Hungary first participated at the Olympic Games at the inaugural 1896 Games, and has sent athletes to compete in most Summer Olympic Games and every Winter Olympic Games since then. The nation was not invited to the 1920 Games for its role in World War I, and was part of the Soviet-led boycott of the 1984 Summer Olympics.

Hungarian athletes have won a total of 511 medals at the Summer Games and 10 medals at the Winter Games, with fencing being the top medal-producing sport. Hungary has won more Summer Olympic medals than any other existing nation never to have hosted the Games, and after overtaking Finland at the 2020 Olympic Games, it is now the country with the highest number of gold medals won per capita (not counting microstates with less than 1 million inhabitants).

The National Olympic Committee for Hungary is the Hungarian Olympic Committee, and was created and recognized in 1895.

Medal tables

Medals by Olympic Games

Medals by Summer Games

Medals by Winter Games

Medals by sport

Medals by summer sport
 Updated after 2020 Summer Olympics

Medals by winter sport
 Updated after 2022 Winter Olympics

Youth Games medal tables

Medals by Summer Youth Games

Medals by Winter Youth Games

Medals by sport

Medals by summer sport
 Updated after 2018 Summer Youth Olympics

Medals by winter sport
 Updated after 2020 Winter Youth Olympics

Athletes with most medals

The Hungarian athletes who won the most medals in the history of the Olympic Games are the fencer Aladár Gerevich and the gymnast Ágnes Keleti.

Notes: athletes in bold are still active.

Flagbearers

Summary by sport

Summer Olympic Sports
 Updated after 2020 Summer Olympics

Athletics

Hungary first competed in athletics at the inaugural 1896 Games, with 3 athletes competing in 5 events and winning a silver and two bronze medals. The nation's first gold medal in the sport came in 1900, with Rudolf Bauer's victory in the discus throw.

Basketball

Hungary men's national basketball team

Hungary women's national basketball team

Boxing

Canoeing

Fencing

Hungary has won the third-most gold medals and second-most total medals in fencing, in each case behind Italy and France. Hungary has historically been most successful in the sabre events. Hungary's first fencing appearance was in 1900, with 7 fencers including sabreurs who finished 4th and 5th. Hungary has dominated the men's individual sabre, winning half of the gold medals (14 of 28), including a string of 9 consecutive victories from 1924 to 1964 (with an 11-Games podium streak extending further to 1972). Hungary had also won in 1908 and 1912; the streaks might have been 12 and 15 if the nation had not been excluded from the Games in 1920 due to its role in World War I.

Gymnastics

Hungary sent two gymnasts to the first Games in 1896; they did not medal.

Handball

Hungary men's national handball team

Hungary women's national handball team

Modern pentathlon

Shooting

Swimming

Hungary first competed in swimming at the inaugural 1896 Games, with one swimmer (Alfréd Hajós) winning gold medals in both of the events he entered. Hungary also had one swimmer in 1900 taking a medal in every event he entered (Zoltán Halmay, with 2 silvers and a bronze). Hungary has won the fourth-most gold medals of any nation in swimming (28) and sixth-most total medals (73).

Volleyball

Hungary men's national volleyball team

Hungary women's national volleyball team

Water polo

Hungary men's national water polo team

Hungary women's national water polo team

Weightlifting

Hungary first competed in weightlifting at the inaugural 1896 Games, with one lifter competing in one event.

Wrestling

Hungary first competed in wrestling at the inaugural 1896 Games, with one wrestler competing in the open weight class event.

Tennis

Hungary first competed in tennis at the inaugural 1896 Games, with one player in the men's singles earning a bronze medal. It remains (through the 2016 Games) the only tennis medal won by Hungary.

Winter Olympic Sports
 Updated after 2022 Winter Olympics

Alpine skiing

Biathlon

Bobsleigh

Cross-country skiing

Figure skating

Freestyle skiing

Ice hockey

Hungary men's national ice hockey team

Nordic combined

Short track speed skating

Ski jumping

1 Athletes did not start at the Games.

Snowboarding

Speed skating

See also
 :Category:Olympic competitors for Hungary
 Hungary at the Paralympics
 List of Hungarian Olympic champions

References

External links